Hyperomyzus lactucae, known generally as the blackcurrant--sowthistle aphid or sow thistle aphid, is a species of aphid in the family Aphididae. It is found in Europe.

Subspecies
These two subspecies belong to the species Hyperomyzus lactucae:
 Hyperomyzus lactucae asiatica Narzikulov & Umarov, 1969
 Hyperomyzus lactucae lactucae (Linnaeus, 1758)

References

External links

 

Articles created by Qbugbot
Insects described in 1758
Taxa named by Carl Linnaeus
Macrosiphini